Carlos Fernández Vallespín (Ferrol, 13 July 1913 – Madrid, 28 April 1977) was a Spanish military officer.

Biography 
Carlos Fernández Vallespín was born in Ferrol, Galicia on 13 July 1913. He entered the Toledo Infantry Academy in 1935, and participated in the Spanish coup of July 1936 in Madrid at the beginning of the Spanish Civil War, being wounded and taken prisoner by the Republicans. After managing to escape, he participated in various actions within the Nationalist faction. Following the Civil War, he fought on the Eastern Front of World War II, in the ranks of the Blue Division, or the 250th Infantry Division of the German Wehrmacht, being wounded again.

In 1965 he reached the rank of brigadier general. He served as director of the General Military Academy between 1968 and 1969.

In 1969 he was promoted to major general and was appointed General Commander of Ceuta.

In 1974 he was appointed Chief of the Defence High Command , the principal staff body of the Francoist Spanish Armed Forces, in charge of coordination between the general staffs of the three military branches. With the advent of democracy and the restructuring of the Armed Forces, he was appointed President of the newly created Board of Joint Chiefs of Staff  in 1977.

Shortly after this last appointment, he died in Madrid of a myocardial infarction, on 28 April 1977.

References 

1913 births
1977 deaths
People from Galicia (Spain)
People from Ferrol, Spain
20th-century Spanish military personnel
Spanish lieutenant generals
Spanish captain generals
Spanish military personnel of the Spanish Civil War (National faction)
Spanish military personnel of World War II